The 2000 Church bombings refers to the serial bombings of churches in the southern Indian states of Karnataka, Goa and Andhra Pradesh by the Islamist extremist group Deendar Anjuman in the year 2000.

Bombings 

On 21 May 2000, a Christian congregation at Machilipatnam was bombed.

On 28 May 2000, bombs exploded in churches at Medak and Vikarabad.

On 8 June 2000, two bombs exploded at the St Annes Church in Wadi. The church was damaged and two persons were injured.

On 9 June 2000, a bomb exploded in the St. Andrews church in Vasco, Goa.

On 8 July 2000, two churches bombed in Andhra Pradesh, Gewett Memorial Baptist Church in Ongole and the Mother Vannini Catholic Church in Tadepalligudem town. The blast in the Ongole church injured three persons.

On 8 July 2000, a blast took place at the St Johns Lutheran Church in Hubbali.

On 9 July 2000, a bomb exploded at the St Peter Paul Church in Bengaluru.

On 9 July 2000, a bomb went off accidentally while the terrorists were transporting them in a Maruti van.

Aftermath 
Deendar Anjuman was banned in May 2001 for engineering the serial bomb blasts, and carrying out a hate campaign against the Christian community. The group's founder Siddique is reported to have hated Christians after the British colonial government in 1934 jailed Siddiqui and 18 of his followers for indulging in inflammatory speeches and writings.

In October 2007 the ban was extended and the group declared an unlawful association under the Unlawful Activities (Prevention) Act for "indulging in activities which are pre-judicial to the security of the country having the potential to disturb peace and communal harmony and to disrupt the secular fabric of the country".

In 2008, Capital punishment was awarded to 11 people and life sentence to 12 others by a local court. The prime accused in the case, Zia-ul-Hassan, was the son of Syed Siddique Hussain, the founder of Deendar Anjuman. Zia-ul-Hassan had migrated to Pakistan and used to visit Hyderabad during his father's death anniversary. The accused believed that the "blasts at churches in India would trigger a civil war between Hindus and Christians, and a religious leader from Afghanistan would invade and conquer India, which would be converted into an Islamic country".

The serial blasts were carried out by activists of Deendar Channabasaveshwara Anjuman, founded in the 1920s. The conspiracy began in October 1999 in Hyderabad, during the death anniversary of its founder Hajrath Moulana Siddiqui.

References

2000 in Christianity
Explosions in 2000
Terrorist incidents in India in 2000
Islamic terrorism in India
Islamic terrorist incidents in 2000
Islamist attacks on churches